The Raymond Hough House, at 312 S. 2nd in Bridger, Montana, was built in 1910.  It was listed on the National Register of Historic Places in 1987.

It is a two-story wood-frame house.  The house has elements of Colonial Revival and Queen Anne style.

References

Houses on the National Register of Historic Places in Montana
Queen Anne architecture in Montana
Colonial Revival architecture in Montana
Houses completed in 1910
Houses in Carbon County, Montana
National Register of Historic Places in Carbon County, Montana